is a Japanese manga artist and writer. After publishing manga anonymously, he launched his first series, Kakegurui – Compulsive Gambler, in 2014, which has achieved commercial success. Following Kakegurui – Compulsive Gamblers success, Kawamoto has been involved with many other manga, anime, and video game series, such as Cheat Slayer, Build Divide, and High Card.

Biography
Kawamoto began working as a manga artist in 2009, when he began posting manga to the Nitosha manga website under the pen name . In 2014, he launched his first series, Kakegurui – Compulsive Gambler, in Gangan Joker. The series has performed well, with over five million copies in print. The series has also received multiple adaptations, notably an anime television series. A spin-off, titled Kakegurui Twin, was launched in 2015.

In 2021, Kawamoto launched Cheat Slayer in Monthly Dragon Age. However, following the release of the first chapter, readers began to notice similarities to other popular series. This eventually lead to Cheat Slayer being canceled after one chapter. Kawamoto later apologized on Twitter.

Works

Manga
 Kakegurui – Compulsive Gambler (2014–present) (serialized in Gangan Joker; illustrated by Tōru Naomura)
 Kakegurui Twin (2015–present) (serialized in Gangan Joker; illustrated by Kei Saiki)
 Rengoku Deadroll (2015–2017) (serialized in Monthly Dragon Age; illustrated by Hideyaki Yoshimura)
 Isekai Hōtei: Rebuttal Barrister (2016–2018) (serialized in Young Ace; illustrated by Shimomon Ohba)
 Chrono Ma:gia: Mugen no Haguruma (2018–2019) (serialized in Weekly Shōnen Sunday; co-written by Hikaru Muno and illustrated by Takeshi Azuma)
 Legal Egg (2020–2021) (serialized in Evening; illustrated by Yasoko Momen)
 Greatest M: Ijin Mahjong Taisen (2020–present) (serialized in Sunday Webry; co-written by Hikaru Muno and Mika Mizuguchi and illustrated by Shutaro Yamada)
  (2020–present) (serialized in Monthly Comic Zenon; illustrated by Makoto Shizuoka)
 Cheat Slayer (2021) (serialized in Monthly Dragon Age; illustrated by Aki Yamaguchi)
 Humanity's Existence Depends on Love Gambling with Another World's Princess (2021–present) (serialized in Champion Red; illustrated by Zuzu Kamiya)
 Bakumatsu Tobaku Barbaroi (2022–present) (serialized in Shōnen Jump+; illustrated by Toyotaka Haneda)
 Yūsha Party no Nimotsu Mochi (2022–present) (serialized in Gangan Joker; illustrated by Ryō Yajima)

Anime
 Build Divide (2021–2022) (co-creator)
 High Card (2023) (co-creator)

Games
 Yurukill: The Calumniation Games (2022) (writer)

References

External links
  
 

Japanese male writers
Living people
Manga artists
Year of birth missing (living people)